CRRC Qishuyan Co., Ltd. is one of the major diesel locomotive manufacturers in China. It one of the subsidiary companies of CRRC Limited.

History
Qishuyan Locomotive Works was founded in 1905.

In Qishuyan Locomotive Works was formed into CSR Group Locomotive Co., Ltd. (as part of the China South Locomotive and Rolling Stock Industry (Group) Corporation CSRG). In December 2007 it was renamed CSR Qishuyan Locomotive Co., Ltd.

List of locomotives

 China Railways JS
 China Railways DF
 China Railways DF2
 China Railways DF8
 China Railways DF11
 China Railways DF11G
 China Railways NDJ3
 China Railways HXN5
 China Railways HXN5B

References

External links
 

CRRC Group
Vehicle manufacturing companies established in 1905
Wujin District
Companies based in Changzhou
1905 establishments in China